Bussoleno is a railway station in Bussoleno. The station is located on the Turin-Modane railway. The train services are operated by Trenitalia.

Train services
The station is served by the following services:

Turin Metropolitan services (SFM3) Bardonecchia - Bussoleno - Turin
Turin Metropolitan services (SFM3) Susa - Bussoleno - Turin

References

 This article is based upon a translation of the Italian language version as of October 2015.

External links

Railway stations in the Metropolitan City of Turin
Railway stations opened in 1854
1854 establishments in the Kingdom of Sardinia
Bussoleno